rFpro, originally rFactor Pro, is a driving simulation software used by racing teams and car manufacturers for advanced driver-assistance systems, self-driving cars and vehicle dynamics. rFactor Pro was created in 2007 as a project of a F1 racing team, using Image Space Incorporated's rFactor as a codebase. It has since been used by more F1 racing teams, top road car OEMs, Tier 1 suppliers, and motorsport manufacturers. It was originally developed for driver-in-the-Loop simulations, but has since been used for autonomous vehicle training as well. It is not licensed to consumers.

History
rFactor Pro was created in 2007 as a project of a F1 team, using the rFactor simulator as a codebase, and has since been used by more F1 racing teams, including Force India in 2009, Ferrari in 2014 and Alfa Romeo in 2019.

rFpro is developed by rFpro Limited, based in Wiltshire, UK. In 2017 rFpro acquired Image Space Incorporated's ISIMotor gaming engine, including the gMotor graphics engine, which it had been licensing since 2007. In 2019 rFpro was acquired by AB Dynamics.

In 2020 rFpro partnered with cosin scientific software to enable FTire (Flexible Ring Tire Model) to run with rFpro.

Features
rFpro features a 120 Hz graphics engine, a library of high definition laser scanned tracks and roads, and an infrastructure in which users can plug their in-house vehicle physics through a Simulink or a C/C++ interface. Alternatively rFpro rigid multibody physics engine can be used, which samples suspension and drive-train at 800Hz. rFpro includes a tool called TerrainServer, which can feed the LiDAR data with a 1cm resolution to a vehicle model running in realtime up to 5kHz. The library of laser scanned tracks includes most of those used in the F1 championship.

In switching to rFpro for its simulator software in 2014, the Ferrari F1 team cited the high fidelity of the reproduced track surface, with an accuracy better than 1mm in Z (height) and 1cm in X and Y (position), which represented a ten-fold improvement over their previous solution. They also cited the ability to respond to dynamic inputs faster than the driver can detect.

See also
 Modelica
 Powertrain
 rFactor 2

References

Further reading
 Nair, V. G., & Wishart, J. (2018) A study of driving simulation platforms for automated vehicles CAV Final Report, Arizona State University.
 Rachel Evans Quantum leaps, Automotive Testing Technology International, September 2015

External links
 https://www.rfpro.com
 https://twitter.com/rfpronews

Automotive software
Driving simulators
Racing simulators
Simulation software
Industrial software